Vigoda is a surname.

People
Notable people with the surname include:

Abe Vigoda (1921–2016), American actor

 Samuel Vigoda, Polish cantor from Dobrzyń nad Wisłą
Val Vigoda, American electric violinist and singer-songwriter

Characters
Eddie Vigoda, a fictional character from the 2009 film Nine Dead
Sam Vigoda, a fictional character from the 1996 film Night Falls on Manhattan

Surnames of Polish origin